Chamonix-Mont-Blanc station is a railway station in the commune of Chamonix-Mont-Blanc, in the French department of Haute-Savoie. It is located on the  gauge Saint-Gervais–Vallorcine line of SNCF. The station is adjacent to the station of the Chemin de fer du Montenvers, which operates a rack railway to the Mer de Glace.

Services 
 the following services stop at Chamonix-Mont-Blanc:

References

External links 
 
 

Railway stations in Haute-Savoie